The 1978 Virginia Slims Championships were the seventh WTA Tour Championships, the annual tennis tournament for the best female tennis players in singles on the 1978 WTA Tour. The singles event consisted of two round robin groups (Gold and Orange) of four players each. The winners of each group played each other in the final and additionally there was a play-off match for third place. The tournament was held from March 29 to April 2, 1978 in the Oakland Coliseum Arena. Top-seeded Martina Navratilova won the singles event and the accompanying $50,000 first prize money.

Finals

Singles

 Martina Navratilova defeated  Evonne Goolagong, 7–6(5–0), 6–4

Doubles
 Billie Jean King /  Martina Navratilova defeated  Virginia Wade /  Françoise Dürr, 6–4, 6–4

Prize money

See also
 1978 Colgate Series Championships

References

External links
 

Tennis tournaments in the United States
WTA Tour Championships
Tennis in California
Virginia Slims Championships
Virginia Slims Championships
Virginia Slims Championships
Virginia Slims Championships